The Women's Marathon at the 1984 Summer Olympics in Los Angeles, California (United States) was  held on August 5, 1984. It was the first time a women's marathon had been held at the Olympic Games. The 50 competitors came from 28 countries. 44 finished the race. The world record holder Joan Benoit of the United States won the gold medal, with the silver medal going to the 1983 World champion Grete Waitz of Norway, and bronze to Rosa Mota of Portugal. 

Strategically, the race was notable for Benoit making a bold move in only the third mile of the race, despite the August heat. The rest of the field did not try to keep pace with her, and Benoit maintained her lead all the way to finish, defeating Waitz by more than a minute.  

The race was also notable for Gabriela Andersen-Schiess from Switzerland, who entered the stadium for the final lap in a state of almost total exhaustion, barely able to walk but eventually completing the race, collapsing at the finishing line and being immediately treated by medical personnel. She finished 37th.

Medalists

Abbreviations
All times shown are in hours:minutes:seconds

Records

Final ranking

See also
 1982 Women's European Championships Marathon (Athens)
 1983 Women's World Championships Marathon (Helsinki)
 1984 Marathon Year Ranking
 1986 Women's European Championships Marathon (Stuttgart)
 1987 Women's World Championships Marathon (Rome)

References

External links
  sports-reference

M
Marathons at the Olympics
1984 marathons
1984 Summer Olympics
Summer Olympics marathon
Marathons in the United States
Women's events at the 1984 Summer Olympics